The 1994 FIVB Volleyball World League was the fifth edition of the annual men's international volleyball tournament, played by 12 countries from 6 May to 30 July 1994. The Final Round was held in Milan, Italy.

Pools composition

Intercontinental round

Pool A

|}

|}

Pool B

|}

|}

Pool C

|}

|}

Final round
Venue:  Forum di Assago, Assago, Italy

Pool play
Pool winners of Intercontinental Round will play against runners-up from other pools.

|}

|}

Final four

Semifinals

|}

3rd place match

|}

Final

|}

Final standing

Awards
Most Valuable Player
  Andrea Giani
Best Spiker
  Kim Se-jin
Best Setter
  Shin Young-chul
Best Blocker
  Jan Posthuma
Best Server
  Lyubomir Ganev
Best Receiver
  Park Hee-sang
Best Digger
  Akihiko Matsuda

External links

1994 World League Results
Sports123

FIVB Volleyball World League
FIVB World League
Volleyball
1994 in Italian sport